David Goldblatt (born 26 September 1965, London) is a British sports writer, broadcaster, sociologist, journalist and author. Among his books are The Games: A Global History of the Olympics, The Game of Our Lives: The Meaning and Making of English Football, Futebol Nation: A Footballing History of Brazil, and The Ball Is Round: A Global History of Football (described as the "seminal football history" by Simon Kuper).

Goldblatt taught sociology of sport at Bristol University and Pitzer College. He was initially a medical student but later studied for a sociology degree.

In 2010, he produced an audio documentary for the BBC entitled The Power and the Passion.

Goldblatt has written for the Guardian, the Observer, The Times Literary Supplement, the Financial Times and The Independent on Sunday, as well as magazines New Statesman, New Left Review and Prospect. Recently he has been a contributor to Howler as well as a guest for the magazine's podcast outlet, "Dummy".

He is a supporter of Tottenham Hotspur and Bristol Rovers.

Bibliography
The Games: A Global History of the Olympics. W. W. Norton & Company, 2016.
The Ball is Round: A Global History of Football
The Football Book
The Game of Our Lives
Futebol Nation: The Story of Brazil through Soccer

References

British male journalists
British sportswriters
British sports journalists
1965 births
Living people
People from Watford
British sociologists